Smith Lake is an unincorporated community in Middleville Township, Wright County, Minnesota, United States.  The community is located along Wright County Road 5 near 50th Street SW.  Nearby places include Cokato and Howard Lake.

Smith Lake was platted in 1869, and named after nearby Smith Lake. A post office was established at Smith Lake in 1871, and remained in operation until 1914.

References

Unincorporated communities in Minnesota
Unincorporated communities in Wright County, Minnesota